The prime minister of Vietnam, officially styled as the Prime Minister of the Government of the Socialist Republic, is the head of government of Vietnam who presides over the meetings of the Central Government (formerly the Council of Ministers). The prime minister directs the work of government members, and may propose deputy prime ministers to the National Assembly.

The head of government is responsible to the National Assembly and serves as the Deputy Chairman of the Council for Defence and Security. Moreover, prime minister is also Chairman of the Council for National Education, Standing Member of the Central Military Commission and the Central Police Party Committee. The tenure of a prime minister is five years, and the term is renewable once. The current prime minister Phạm Minh Chính has served since 2021. In case of incapacity, a deputy prime minister assumes the office of acting prime minister until the prime minister resumes duty, or until the appointment of a new prime minister.

The powers and prestige of the prime minister have varied through the years. Pham Van Dong, Vietnam's second prime minister, often lamented that in practice he had little power. Since the death of Pham Hung in 1988, the prime minister has been ranked 3rd in the order of precedence of the Communist Party's Politburo, the highest decision-making body in Vietnam.

History

Ho Chi Minh, who also served as the country's President, was appointed Vietnam's first prime minister in 1946 by the National Assembly, after having served months as Acting Chairman of the Provisional Government and foreign minister in the aftermath of the 1945 August Revolution. Both the 1946 and 1959 Constitutions state that the National Assembly had the power to appoint and relieve the prime minister of his duties. The prime minister presided over the Council of Ministers, the highest executive body of state, from 1981 until it was renamed to Government in the 1992 constitution. The office of prime minister was renamed in the 1980 constitution to that of Chairman of the Council of Ministers.

Pham Van Dong, the second Prime Minister of Vietnam, served as North Vietnamese Prime Minister from 1955 until 1976, when he became prime minister of a unified Vietnam, and then until 1987, when he resigned. At his resignation, he was the longest-serving prime minister in Vietnamese history, and the oldest serving prime minister in the world. He often lamented that he was one of the world's weakest prime ministers, on one occasion saying; "I can do nothing. When I say something, nobody listens. If I propose changing a deputy minister, it turns out to be impossible. I cannot even choose my own ministers." Since the death of Pham Hung in 1988, the prime minister has been ranked Number 3 in the order of precedence of the Communist Party's Politburo.

Duties, powers and responsibilities

The National Assembly by a proposal of the President of Vietnam elects the prime minister. The prime minister is responsible to the National Assembly, and the Assembly elects all ministers to government. Activity reports by the prime minister must be given to the National Assembly, while the Standing Committee of the National Assembly supervises the activities of the Central Government and the prime minister. Finally, the deputies of the National Assembly have the right to question the prime minister and other members of government.

The prime minister is the only member of government who must be a member of the National Assembly. This is because the prime minister is accountable to the National Assembly, and he reports to it, or to its Standing Committee, and to the president. The prime minister issues directives and supervises the implementation of formal orders given by the president, the National Assembly or the Standing Committee. Cabinet members and members of the Central Government in general are responsible to the prime minister and the National Assembly for the fields they specialise in. According to the Constitution of Vietnam, the following are the duties, powers and responsibilities of the prime minister:
 To head the Central Government, and direct the works of members of the Central Government, the People's Councils at all levels and to chair the meetings of the Cabinet;
 To propose to the National Assembly that ministries, or organs with ministerial rank, be established or dissolved; to present to the National Assembly or, when the latter is not in session, to its Standing Committee, for approval, proposals on the appointment, release from duty, or dismissal of deputy prime ministers, cabinet ministers and other members of the Government;
 To appoint, release from duty, or dismiss deputy ministers and officials of equal rank; to approve the election, release from duty, secondment and dismissal of chairmen and deputy chairmen of People's Committees of provinces and cities under direct central rule;
 To suspend or annul decisions, directives and circulars of cabinet ministers and other Government members, decisions and directives of People's Councils and chairmen of People's Committees of provinces and cities under direct central rule that contravene the Constitution, the law, or other formal written documents of superior State organs;
 To suspend the execution of resolutions of People's Councils of provinces and cities under direct central rule that contravene the Constitution, the law, or the formal written orders of superior State organs; at the same time to propose to the Standing Committee of the National Assembly to annul them;
 To make regular reports to the people through the mass media on major issues to be settled by the Government.
 When the prime minister is absent, he must choose one of his deputy prime ministers to direct the work of the government.

The prime minister serves concurrently as the secretary of the CPV Government Caucus Commission. The National Assembly chairman serves as the commission's deputy. Currently there are ten members of the commission, all of whom hold government posts. Commission members are appointed by the Politburo, and the Commission itself is responsible to the Politburo and the Secretariat. The decision-making process within the commission is based on the principles of collective leadership.

References

Bibliography

 

 
Government of Vietnam
1945 establishments in Vietnam